The 2010–11 Louisiana–Lafayette Ragin' Cajuns men's basketball team  represented the University of Louisiana at Lafayette during the 2010–11 NCAA Division I men's basketball season. The Ragin' Cajuns, led by first year head coach Bob Marlin, played their home games at the Cajundome and were members of the West Division of the Sun Belt Conference. They finished the season 14–15, 11–5 in Sun Belt play to finish in second place in the West Division. They lost in the quarterfinals of the Sun Belt Basketball tournament to Western Kentucky. They were not invited to any other post-season tournament.

Roster

Schedule

|-
!colspan=9 style=| Exhibition

|-
!colspan=9 style=| Regular season

|-
!colspan=9 style=| Sun Belt Tournament

References

Louisiana Ragin' Cajuns men's basketball seasons
Louisiana-Lafayette
Louisiana
Louisiana